Thomas Beaufort, Duke of Exeter (c. January 137731 December 1426) was an English military commander during the Hundred Years' War, and briefly Chancellor of England. He was the third of the four children born to John of Gaunt, Duke of Lancaster, and his mistress Katherine Swynford. To overcome their problematic parentage, his parents were married in 1396, and he and his siblings were legitimated in 1390 and again in 1397. He married the daughter of Sir Thomas Neville (died 1387) of Hornby, Margaret Neville (born c. 1384), who bore him one son, Henry Beaufort. However, the child died young.

Under Henry IV
After the accession of his half-brother Henry IV, Beaufort was made a Knight of the Garter. In the following years he held various military posts: constable of Ludlow (1402), appointed Admiral of the North (1403), appointed captain of Calais (1407), and  Admiral of the North and West (1408–1413) he retained the title for life. His most notable action during this decade was commanding the forces against the northern rebellion of 1405.

He became Chancellor of England on 31 January 1410, an office he held until 5 January 1412 during a time when King Henry was having trouble with the clergy, and then returned to military matters. Later in 1412 he was created Earl of Dorset.

Under Henry V
On the accession of Henry V, Beaufort was appointed Lieutenant of Aquitaine (1413) and then captain of Harfleur (1415). He spent the next years in Normandy as Lieutenant of Normandy (1416). He was created Duke of Exeter for life in 1416.

Beaufort was back in England in 1417, while the king was in Normandy, but had to deal with problems in Scotland. In 1418 he went back to Normandy with a large force, taking part in the sieges of Évreux, Ivry, and Rouen. After the fall of Rouen in 1419, he was captain of the city and conquered more of the smaller Norman cities. Finally, in 1419, he took the great fortress of Château Gaillard, midway between Rouen and Paris, after a six-month siege.

During this time, Henry V had a policy of creating Norman titles for his aristocrats, thus Beaufort was created Count of Harcourt in 1418.

In 1420, Beaufort helped negotiate the treaty of Troyes. The next year he was captured at the Battle of Baugé, where his nephew Thomas of Lancaster, 1st Duke of Clarence, was killed.

Beaufort was one of the executors of Henry V's will, and so returned to England in 1422. He served on the governing council for the infant king Henry VI, though it is likely he spent some time in France as well.

The character of Exeter in Shakespeare's play Henry V is based on Beaufort, although Beaufort was not actually created Duke of Exeter until after the Battle of Agincourt. In 1415 he was Earl of Dorset.

He died on 31 December 1426. 27 December 1426 or 1 January 1427 have been suggested as alternative dates. All of his titles (Duchy of Exeter, Earldom of Dorset, Countship of Harcourt) became extinct. The Duchy of Exeter was restored to the Holland family; the Earldom of Dorset was recreated for Edmund, Count of Mortain, his nephew.

Arms
As a legitimated grandson of the sovereign, Beaufort bore the arms of the kingdom, differenced by a bordure gobony azure and ermine.

See also
 List of Lord Chancellors and Lord Keepers

Footnotes

|-

1377 births
1426 deaths
14th-century English Navy personnel
15th-century English Navy personnel
201
Younger sons of dukes
Lord chancellors of England
Lord High Admirals of England
People of the Hundred Years' War
Life peers created by Henry V
Peers created by Henry IV of England
Knights of the Garter
Thomas Beaufort, Duke of Exeter
Thomas Beaufort